Tubercular may refer to:

 tubercle
 tuberculosis